Nuguria (Nukuria) was a Polynesian language, spoken by approximately 550 people on Nuguria in the eastern islands of Papua New Guinea.  The language was taught in primary schools in Nuguria and was used for daily communications between adults and children.  Nuguria is one of the eighteen small islands to the east of Papua New Guinea, which are known as the Polynesian Outliers.  The Nukuria language has been concluded to be closely related to other nearby languages such as Nukumanu, Takuu, Nukuoro, and Luangiua.  Research on the Nuguria Atoll and the language itself is scarce; past research demonstrated that this language was at risk of potential endangerment. The language was only then classified as at risk of endangerment because it was still used between generations and was passed on to the children. However, recent research indicates that Nukuria is now most likely an extinct language.

Classification 
Nukuria is a Polynesian language and a part of the Austronesian language family, which includes Tagalog, Marshallese, and Tongan. The Austronesian language family is a language family that extends throughout the Pacific Islands and parts of Asia. It is one of three major language families in the Pacific. The Austronesian language family ( not to be confused with Austroasiatic languages) is also divided into ten subgroups, one of which is Malayo-Polynesian.  Nukuria is a part of the Malayo-Polynesian subgroup because of its southeast location to Asia.  It is further grouped into Ellicean, one of  the eleven Nuclear Polynesian branches.  The Nuclear Polynesian language is divided into two major branches: Samoic and Eastern Polynesian. The Nuclear Polynesian languages are classified as languages in this region that are not a Tongic language (Tongan and Niuean).

Geographic distribution 
Nukuria is a language in opposition to a dialect and it is spoken in the Nuguria Atoll. It is alternatively known as the Fead Islands located in the Bougainville Province. Other nearby island groups include: Nukumanu, Takuu, Buka, Bougainville all of which are endangered languages. Nuguria Island lies on the outer edge of Melanesia, making it a Polynesian Outlier.  Polynesian Outliers are the islands that do not exist within the major boundaries of Polynesia, but instead they are within Melanesia and/or Micronesia. The Nuguria Atoll is located in Melanesia along with the Solomon Islands.

Grammar 
There is a distinct scarceness of research on the grammar and alphabet of the Nukuria Language, but it is understood that as with many Austronesian languages, Nukuria has a subject-verb-object sentence structure. However, all of the Austronesian Languages within the Bismarck Archipelago have a subject-verb-object sentence structure. This sentence structure (typology) is also used in the English language, which is a part of the Indo-European language family.

Phonology
The Nukuria language's alphabet contains five vowels: /a/, /e/, /i/, /o/, /u/, and fifteen consonants: /p/,/b/,/m/,/f/,/v/,/t/,/s/,/n/,/l/,/r/,/k/,/g/,/ŋ/,/w/,/h/. There are five stops, four fricatives, three nasals, two approximants, and one trill.  Of those consonants three are bilabial, two are labiodental, five are alveolar, four are velar, and one is glottal.

To provide a comparison, the Nukuria Language has seven more consonants than the Hawaiian language ('Ōlelo Hawaiʻi'): /m/,/n/,/p/,/t ~ k/,/ ʔ/, /h/,/ w~v/,and /l/. It also has five consonants more than Māori, (te reo): /p/,/t/,/k/,/wh/,/h/,/m/,/n/,/ŋ/,/r/,and /w/. Hawaiian and Māori are used for comparison because they are two of the more commonly known Polynesian Languages. In addition, the English language has twenty-four consonants and at least fourteen vowels.

The ŋ is a voiced velar nasal and is present in the suffix "ing" such as in the English word "ending". It is the "ng" sound in the words: "laughing", "crying", "hiking", "jumping" and so on.

References

Ellicean languages